Palazzo Bentivoglio may refer to:

 Palazzo Bentivoglio, Bologna
 Palazzo Bentivoglio, Ferrara

Architectural disambiguation pages